The nine-tailed fox is a mythical fox entity originating from Chinese mythology that is a common motif in East Asian mythology and the most famous fox spirit in Chinese culture.

In Chinese and East Asian folklore, foxes are depicted as spirits possessed of magic powers. These foxes are often depicted as mischievous, usually tricking other people, with the ability to disguise themselves as a beautiful woman. The Nine-tailed fox is sometimes compared to the Werewolf in the European folklore

Origin 

The earliest mention of nine-tailed fox is the Shanhaijing (Classic of Mountains and Seas), compiled from the Warring States period (475 BC–221 BC) to the Western Han (202 BC – 9 AD; 25 AD –220 AD) period. The work states:

In chapter 14 of the Shanhaijing, Guo Pu had commented that the nine-tailed fox was an auspicious omen that appeared during times of peace. However, in chapter 1, another aspect of the nine-tailed fox is described: 

In one ancient myth, Yu the Great encountered a white nine-tailed fox, which he interpreted as an auspicious sign that he would marry Nüjiao. In Han iconography, the nine-tailed fox is sometimes depicted at Mount Kunlun and along with Xi Wangmu in her role as the goddess of immortality. According to the first-century Baihutong (Debates in the White Tiger Hall), the fox's nine tails symbolize abundant progeny.

Describing the transformation and other features of the fox, Guo Pu (276–324) made the following comment: 

The Youyang Zazu made a connection between nine-tailed foxes and the divine: 

Popular fox worship during the Tang dynasty has been mentioned in a text entitled Hu Shen (Fox gods):

In popular culture

Games 
 Ninetales in Pokémon (1996)
 Ahri in League of Legends (2009)
 Kyubi in Yo-kai Watch (2013)
 Kurama in Naruto / Boruto (2002)

Literature, graphic novels, comics 
 Kurama in Yuyu Hakusho (1990)
 Kurama The Nine Tails Fox Kiyubi Naruto (1999)
 Nine tails Guardian The God of Highschool (2011)
 The Sandman: The Dream Hunters (1999)
 Lico in The Demon Girl Next Door (2014)
 Fox Spirit Matchmaker (2015)
 The Helpful Fox Senko-san (2017)
 Shuos Jedao in Ninefox Gambit (2016)

Film 
 Painted Skin (2008) and its sequel (2012)
 A Chinese Fairy Tale (2011)
 League of Gods (2016)
 Once Upon a Time (2017)
 Hanson and the Beast (2017)
 The Legend of Hei (2019)
 Jiang Ziyia (2020)
 Soul Snatcher (2020)
 Shang-Chi and the Legend of the Ten Rings (2021)
 Umma (2022)

TV series 
 The Legend of Nezha  (2003)
 Strange Tales of Liao Zhai  (2005)
 The Legend and the Hero (2007) and its sequel (2009)
 My Girlfriend Is a Gumiho (2010)
 The Investiture of the Gods (2014) and The Investiture of the Gods 2 (2015)
 Legend of Nine Tails Fox (2016)
 Fox in the Screen  (2016)
 Eternal Love  (2017)
 Moonshine and Valentine (2017)
 Beauties in the Closet  (2018)
 Investiture of the Gods (2019)
 Love, Death & Robots Episode 8 (2019)
 The Life of White Fox  (2019)
 Eternal Love of Dream (2020)
 Kumiho in Lovecraft Country Episode 6 "Meet Me in Daegu" (2020)
 Lee Dong Wook in Tale Of The Nine Tailed  (2020)

See also
 Huxian, Fox Immortal Huli jing 
 Inari Ōkami, Japanese kami''
 Kitsune
 Kumiho

Reference

Literature
 
 
 

Fox spirit
Yaoguai
Vietnamese legendary creatures
Japanese legendary creatures
Korean legendary creatures
Mythological foxes
Shapeshifters
Therianthropes
Inari faith
Kitsune (fox)